Benjamin Charles Miles (born 29 September 1966) is an English actor, best known for his starring role as Patrick Maitland in the television comedy Coupling, from 2000 to 2004, as Montague Dartie in The Forsyte Saga, from 2002 to 2003, as Peter Townsend in the Netflix drama The Crown (2016–2017) and George in episode 8 "The One That Holds Everything" in the TV drama The Romanoffs (2018).

Early life

Miles was born in Wimbledon, London, and lived as a young man in Ashover, Derbyshire, attending Tupton Hall School.  He began acting in school productions, which he pursued mainly because it allowed him to miss classes. In an interview, Miles stated how he would spend his spare time in a now-defunct record shop (Hudsons) in Chesterfield, Derbyshire, while "thinking about 'finding the one'". He trained at the Guildhall School of Music and Drama.

Career
He moved into television roles in the 1990s, playing supporting roles in such series as Zorro, Soldier Soldier, Is It Legal?, The Bill, Peak Practice and Wonderful You.

Miles played a very small part as a journalist, with just a few words of dialogue, in the 1997 motion picture The Wings of the Dove. In 1999, he was cast as Richard Martin in Reach For The Moon. In 2000, he was cast as Robert Brown in Cold Feet and the womanizing Patrick Maitland in the comedy series Coupling, a role which he played until the series ended in 2004. He continued other television work during his tenure in Coupling, appearing in The Forsyte Saga as Montague Dartie (this was the first time Miles acted with Amanda Root) and in Prime Suspect. In 2004, Miles portrayed Charles Ryder in the BBC Radio 4 production of Brideshead Revisited. Miles was the co-lead in the BBC drama, A Thing Called Love, filmed on location in Nottingham, England.

Miles appeared in the 2005 BBC television drama Mr Harvey Lights a Candle, playing the part of a teacher taking an unruly party of pupils on a daytrip to Salisbury Cathedral. In 2006, he appeared in the TV drama After Thomas as the father of a son with autism. He worked alongside actors such as Clive Mantle. In 2008, he appeared as the squire Sir Timothy in the British production Lark Rise to Candleford, and as Plantagenet Palliser in Radio 4 production The Pallisers. In 2009, he appeared as the head of a stock market trading firm in the BBC city-based drama Sex, the City and Me. He played the lead in Pulse opposite Claire Foy, whom he also co-starred with in The Promise in early 2011, just after also appearing in BBC 1's Zen. They were re-united again in The Crown.

Miles often works with director James McTeigue: he appeared in McTeigue's 2005 film V for Vendetta as Dascombe, in Ninja Assassin, and in Speed Racer.

On stage, he played Bolingbroke in the Old Vic's production of Richard II in 2005 alongside his father-in-law Gary Raymond. Miles also appeared in the play The Norman Conquests as Tom in 2009. The Norman Conquests won a Tony Award during his tenure in the play for Best Revival of a Play.

In summer 2011, Miles starred as Robert in Harold Pinter's Betrayal at the Comedy Theatre in London's West End, with Kristin Scott Thomas playing his wife, Emma. The love triangle was completed by Douglas Henshall as his best friend and her lover, Jerry. The revival was directed by Ian Rickson. Also in 2011 he appeared in the television film The Suspicions of Mr Whicher as Dr. Stapleton.

In 2014 Miles played Thomas Cromwell in the RSC version of Hilary Mantel's novels Wolf Hall and Bring Up the Bodies in Stratford and at the Aldwych Theatre in London. In April 2015 the RSC brought the plays to New York City, where his performance was nominated for Best Leading Actor in a Play at the Tony Awards.

In 2016, he played Peter Townsend in the Netflix series The Crown, and the Duke of Somerset in The Hollow Crown: The Wars of the Roses, the second cycle in a series of television film adaptations of William Shakespeare's history plays. In the same year, he also had a guest role as Chancellor Tom Pickering in an episode of the anthology series Black Mirror ("Hated in the Nation").

In 2017, he voiced the Time Traveller in a Big Finish Productions adaptation of The Time Machine and Ace in the UK dub of Bob the Builder: Mega Machines.

In 2018, he played DSU Jack Haley in the BBC Two miniseries Collateral and Simon's father George Burrows in the series The Romanoffs, and appeared on stage at the Lyttelton Theatre as one of the Lehman Brothers in The Lehman Trilogy.

In 2019 he played Commander Danny Hart in The Capture and John Profumo in The Trial of Christine Keeler, both on BBC One.

In 2021, it was announced that he will be starring in a new Star Wars spin-off television series for Disney, Andor, as well as in the new play The Mirror and the Light at the Gielgud Theatre in London's West End.

Personal life

Miles can play bass, drums, and guitar and is left-handed. He is married to the actress Emily Raymond, who starred in the film Love Lies Bleeding alongside Faye Dunaway; they have three children. The two also appeared together in the episode of Peak Practice, "Before The Lights Go Out" in 1999.

Filmography

Film

Television

References

External links
 
 Ben Miles profile from BBC
 Lark Rise to Candleford from BBC
 Betrayal, "Comedy Theatre Review",  The Telegraph, 17 June 2011
 Betrayal - Review, "Comedy Theatre London",  The Guardian, 17 June 2011
 First Night: Betrayal, "Comedy Theatre London",  The Independent, 17 June 2011

1966 births
English male film actors
English male television actors
English male voice actors
Living people
Alumni of the Guildhall School of Music and Drama
20th-century English male actors
21st-century English male actors
Male actors from London
People from Wimbledon, London
English male stage actors